The German Physical Society (German: , DPG) is the oldest organisation of physicists. The DPG's worldwide membership is cited as 60,547, as of 2019, making it the largest physics society in the world. It holds an annual conference and multiple spring conferences, which are held at various locations and along topical subjects of given sections of the DPG.
The DPG serves the fields of pure and applied physics. Main aims are to bring its members and all physicists living in Germany closer together, represent their entirety outwards as well as foster the exchange of ideas between its members and foreign colleagues. The DPG binds itself and its members to advocate for freedom, tolerance, veracity and dignity in science and to be aware about the fact that the people working in science are responsible to a particularly high extent for the configuration of the overall human activity.

Conferences and fostering young talent
The DPG itself does not carry out any research, but its conferences promote the sharing of information about the latest findings in the field of physics. The traditional spring meetings held by the DPG each year at venues across the country are among largest physics conferences in Europe, attended by around 10,000 experts from Germany and abroad. Fostering young talent is another central concern of the DPG : its conferences provide a platform particularly for younger scientists. The conferences provide students with opportunities to meet renowned scientists in person. The DPG also runs a nationwide network for physics students in the working group Young DPG. Female physicists have a forum of their own in the annual German Conference of Women in Physics.

Awards and school projects
The DPG honours outstanding achievements in physics with awards of international repute. The highest awards which are presented by the DPG are the Max Planck Medal for work in theoretical physics, first awarded in 1929, and the Stern–Gerlach Medal for work in experimental physics, first awarded in 1933. Some awards, such as the Gustav Hertz Prize for Young Physicists, intend to foster young talent. Others are awarded by the DPG in cooperation with other organisations in Germany and abroad, such as the Max Born Medal and Prize or the Otto Hahn Prize. The Medal for Natural Science Journalism is awarded by the DPG to personalities who have made a special contribution to bringing scientific facts to the attention of the general public. In addition, the DPG awards prizes to school graduates throughout the country for outstanding achievements in physics.

Young Scientist Award for Socio- and Econophysics 
Awardees are Vittoria Colizza (2013), Arne Traulsen (2012), Santo Fortunato (2011), Dirk Brockmann (2010), Duncan Watts (2009), Fabrizio Lillo (2008), Katarzyna Sznajd-Weron (2007) for the Sznajd model, Xavier Gabaix (2006), Reuven Cohen (2005), Illes Farkas (2004), Vasliki Plerou (2002) and Damien Challet (2002).

Publications
The DPG produces a range of various publications. The membership journal of the DPG  provides news reports from the DPG and about physics in general. Besides, the DPG joins forces with the British Institute of Physics to publish the electronic open access journal New Journal of Physics. The articles published here have gone through a strict peer review in line with the stringent scientific quality standards propounded by the New Journal of Physics. Moreover, the DPG also publishes its conference programme every year under the name  (Programme Booklets for DPG Conferences), listing the abstracts of around 8,000 papers. And the web portal www.welt-der-physik.de, operated jointly by the DPG and the Federal Ministry of Education and Research (BMBF), provides much information about physics even for nonexperts.

Historical publications
Publications of the DPG have included:
 
 
  (continued as )
 
  (continued as European Physical Journal)

In 1975  was merged with Physics of Condensed Matter.  was published as a 4-part journal from 1920–1997 by Springer-Verlag under the auspices of the DPG. During the early 20th century, it was considered one of the most prestigious journals in physics, with its golden years coinciding with the golden years of quantum mechanics. 
It was the vehicle used by those with avant-garde views and the young generation of quantum physicists in the 1920s.

Physics and public relations
The DPG plays an active role in the dialogue between science and the general public with a range of popular scientific publications, physics outreach, and public events. These activities also include the Highlights of Physics, an annual physics festival organised jointly by the DPG and the Federal Ministry of Education and Research. It is the largest festival of its kind in Germany with around 30,000 visitors every year.

Studies and social commitment
The DPG engages in socio-political discussions by releasing press statements, carrying out studies, giving statements and attending parliamentary evenings. It deals with current issues such as fostering young talent, climate protection, energy supply or arms control through to science and cultural history issues. The DPG is very particularly committed to equal opportunities for men and women and to promote women in natural sciences.

In Bonn and Berlin
The  is not only a meeting place and discussion forum of outstanding significance for physics in Germany but also an international brand for the discipline of physics. Students and cutting edge scientists through to Nobel Prize winners meet here to share their thoughts and ideas on a scientific level. Teaching staffs also gladly come to Bad Honnef time and again to attend advanced training courses relating to pure physics and the didactic aspects of this discipline, in the seminars held by the DPG. The DPG is also present in Germany's capital Berlin. It has been running the Magnus-Haus in Berlin since its reunification with the Physical Society of East Germany in 1990. This urban palace completed in 1760 – bearing the name of the natural scientist Gustav Magnus – has close links to the history of the DPG: it was the regular meeting place of scholars during the 19th century that eventually resulted in the Physical Society of Berlin being founded in 1845, which later became the DPG. Today it is a venue for meetings and lectures on physical and socio-political issues. The Magnus-Haus is also home to the DPG's historical archive.

Under National Socialism
On 7 April 1933, barely two months after Adolf Hitler came to power on 30 January 1933, the Law for the Restoration of the Professional Civil Service, was passed; under this law, Jewish civil servants and regime opponents were removed from their jobs. These policies had significant effects on physics in Germany through significant qualitative and quantitative losses of physicists as a result of emigration and through political decisions overriding those based on academic and scientific considerations; 25% of the physicists holding academic positions in the period 1932–1933 were lost due to the policies.

When the Law for the Restoration of the Professional Civil Service was passed in 1933, the DPG dragged its feet in the dismissal of Jews for more than five years.  It was not until the end of 1938, on the initiation of Herbert Stuart and Wilhelm Orthmann, that the DPG asked Jewish members to withdraw their membership.
Max von Laue, as chairman of the DPG, gave the opening address at the 1933 physics convention held in Würzburg.
These actions brought opposition from members of the DPG. Stark received only two votes! In retribution, Stark canceled the DPG's use of its rooms in the PTR, deleted PTR travel expenses for its personnel to attend DPG meetings, and forbade PTR personnel from lecturing at DPG meetings.
Carl Ramsauer, president of the DPG 1940 to 1945, and his deputy, Wolfgang Finkelnburg, steered a relatively independent course from the party line of the National Socialists and against , which was anti-Semitic and anti-theoretical physics, especially including modern physics, i.e., quantum mechanics. The petition, a letter and six attachments, addressed the atrocious state of physics instruction in Germany, which Ramsauer concluded was the result of politicization of education.

Reunification
The DPG was eventually also reinstituted individually in the American and French sectors. These individually established organizations were united in West Germany in 1950, only after the formation of the Federal Republic of Germany on 23 May 1949. It was only after the fall of the Berlin Wall that the DPG again fully unified across Germany.

Presidents

See also
European Physical Society
Japan Society of Applied Physics
Institute of Physics
American Institute of Physics

References

Further reading
Beyerchen, Alan D. Scientists Under Hitler: Politics and the Physics Community in the Third Reich (Yale, 1977) 
Heilbron, J. L. The Dilemmas of an Upright Man: Max Planck and the Fortunes of German Science (Harvard, 2000) 
Hentschel, Klaus, editor and Ann M. Hentschel, editorial assistant and Translator Physics and National Socialism: An Anthology of Primary Sources (Birkhäuser, 1996) 
Hoffmann, Dieter Between Autonomy and Accommodation: The German Physical Society during the Third Reich, Physics in Perspective  7(3) 293–329 (2005)
Jungnickel, Christa and Russell McCormmach.  Intellectual Mastery of Nature: Theoretical Physics from Ohm to Einstein, Volume 2: The Now Mighty Theoretical Physics, 1870 to 1925.  (University of Chicago Press, Paper cover, 1990) 
Kragh, Helge Quantum Generations: A History of Physics in the Twentieth Century (Princeton, 1999)

External links

 
Scientific organizations established in 1845
1845 establishments in Prussia
1899 establishments in Germany